The 1998 PBA All-Star Weekend is the annual all-star weekend of the Philippine Basketball Association (PBA). Instead of the old formats of pitting its stars from the North against the South or the veterans versus the youngsters, the league this time featured the Philippine Centennial Team against a PBA Selection, reinforced by imports.

They played twice and the first All-Star Game was held outside of Manila since the annual spectacle was institutionalized in 1989.

Skills Challenge Winners
Two-Ball Contest: Allan Caidic and Freddie Abuda (San Miguel)
Three-point Shootout: Jasper Ocampo (Pop Cola)
Buzzer-Beater Contest: Tonyboy Espinosa (Mobiline)

All-Star Game

PBA Selection
Nelson Asaytono (San Miguel)
Bonel Balingit (Pop Cola)
Bal David (Ginebra)
Jerry Codiñera (Purefoods)
Rey Evangelista (Purefoods)
Victor Pablo (Shell)
Dindo Pumaren (Purefoods)
Bong Ravena (Purefoods)
Jason Webb (Sta.Lucia)
John Best (Shell)*
Devin Davis (Alaska)*
Ronnie Coleman (Sta.Lucia)
Roy Hairston (Purefoods)
Coach: Derrick Pumaren (Sta.Lucia)

* Didn't play in the Manila game held at the Cuneta Astrodome.

Philippine Centennial team

Game

References

All-Star Weekend
Philippine Basketball Association All-Star Weekend
Sports in Cebu
Philippines men's national basketball team games